Saudi Arabia has competed in twelve Summer Olympic Games. They first appeared in the 1972 Summer Olympics in Munich, West Germany. Saudi Arabia made their debut in the Winter Olympics in 2022.

Women's participation in the Olympics 

Prior to June 2012, Saudi Arabia banned female athletes from competing at the Olympics. However, following the International Olympic Committee pressuring the Saudi Olympic Committee to send female athletes to the 2012 Summer Olympics, in June 2012 the Saudi Embassy in London announced this had been agreed.

There were calls for Saudi Arabia to be barred from the Olympics until it permitted women to compete, notably from Anita DeFrantz, chair of the International Olympic Committee's Women and Sports Commission, in 2010. In 2008, Ali Al-Ahmed, director of the Institute for Gulf Affairs, likewise called for Saudi Arabia to be barred from the Games, describing its ban on women athletes as a violation of the International Olympic Committee charter. Stating that gender discrimination should be no more acceptable than racial discrimination, he noted: "For the last 15 years, many international nongovernmental organizations worldwide have been trying to lobby the IOC for better enforcement of its own laws banning gender discrimination. [...] While [its] efforts did result in increasing numbers of women Olympians, the IOC has been reluctant to take a strong position and threaten the discriminating countries with suspension or expulsion."

Dalma Rushdi Malhas competed at the 2010 Singapore Youth Olympics and won a bronze medal in equestrian (see Saudi Arabia at the 2010 Summer Youth Olympics). Saudi Arabia agreed on July 12, 2012, to send two women to compete in that year's Games in London, England: the two female athletes were Wojdan Shaherkani in judo, and 800-meter runner Sarah Attar.

Medals

Medals by Summer Games

Medals by Winter Games

Medals by sport

List of medalists

See also

 List of flag bearers for Saudi Arabia at the Olympics
 Saudi Arabia at the Paralympics

References

External links
 
 
 

 
Olympics